Janne Lindberg (born 24 May 1966) is a Finnish former professional footballer managing Finnish fourth-tier side Sudet.

Lindberg joined his local club Kumu as a six-year-old boy where he stayed for 18 years. In 1990, at the age of 24, he moved onto FC Haka and after two years at Haka he transferred to MyPa.

At MyPa Lindberg established himself as a Finnish International, gaining the first of his 34 caps in 1992. He also experienced European football in the UEFA Cup.

In 1994, ex-Morton player Jimmy Pearson recommended Lindberg to then Greenock Morton manager Allan McGraw. As a result, Morton signed Lindberg at a cost of £250,000; a deal that included Lindberg's MyPa teammate and compatriot Marko Rajamäki.

Lindberg (and Rajamäki) made their débuts on 22 October 1994 against Berwick Rangers, a match Morton lost 2–1. However, both players went on to have impressive careers at Morton. Lindberg made approximately 88 appearances, scoring five goals.

In 1997 Lindberg's contract at Morton was not renewed and he signed for German side 1. FC Saarbrücken. His family did not settle in Germany, consequently he returned to former club MyPa in 1998 where he played until 2005.

Coaching career
After a lengthy spell coaching at MyPa, he became coach at VPS Vaasa.

In 2002 Lindberg was instrumental in the transfer of former Finnish Under 21 internationalist Jani Uotinen from MyPa to former club Morton.

In September 2008 Lindberg was appointed as the new head coach of MyPa care-taking the rest of the season after the manager Janne Hyppönen was sacked. Previously Lindberg had worked as an assistant of Hyppönen. He left this post in 2010.

He is currently coaching Sudet.

References

External links
 
 
 

1966 births
Living people
People from Kuusankoski
Finnish footballers
Veikkausliiga players
FC Haka players
Myllykosken Pallo −47 players
Greenock Morton F.C. players
1. FC Saarbrücken players
Finnish football managers
Vaasan Palloseura managers
Finland international footballers
Association football midfielders
Scottish Football League players
Finnish expatriate footballers
Expatriate footballers in Germany
Expatriate footballers in Scotland
Myllykosken Pallo −47 managers
Sportspeople from Kymenlaakso